Tuanku Imam Bonjol (1772 – 6 November 1864), also known as Muhammad Syahab, Peto Syarif, and Malim Basa, was one of the most popular leaders of the Padri movement in Central Sumatra. He was declared a National Hero of Indonesia.

Biography

Tuanku Imam Bonjol was born in Bonjol, Pasaman, West Sumatra. His family, of Moroccan origin, came from Sungai Rimbang, Suliki, Limapuluh Koto. His parents name were Bayanuddin (father) and Hamatun (mother). He was immersed in Islamic studies as he grew up, studying first from his father and later under various other Muslim theologians.

After founding the state of Bonjol, Syarif became involved in the Adat-Padri controversy as a Padri leader. The Padri movement, which has been compared to the Ahlus Sunnah wal Jamaah (Sunni) school of Islam in the now Saudi Arabia, was an effort to return the Islam of the area to the purity of its roots by removing local distortions like gambling, cockfighting, the use of opium and strong drink, tobacco, and so forth. It also opposed the powerful role of women in the matrilineal Minangkabau culture. The Adat, or traditionalist, position was that local custom that pre-dated the arrival of Islam should also be respected and followed.

Feeling their leadership position threatened, the traditionalists appealed to the Dutch for help in their struggle against the Padris. At first, the Dutch were not able to win militarily against the Padris because their resources were stretched thin by the Diponegoro resistance in Java. In 1824, the Dutch signed the Masang Agreement ending hostilities with the state of Bonjol.

Subsequently, however, once the Diponegoro resistance was suppressed, the Dutch attacked the state of Pandai Sikat in a renewed effort to gain control of West Sumatra. Despite valiant fighting by the Indonesians (by this time the traditionalists had realised they didn't want to be ruled by the Dutch either and had joined forces with the Padris in their resistance), the overwhelming power of the Dutch military eventually prevailed. Syarif was captured in 1832 but escaped after three months to continue the struggle from his tiny fortress in Bonjol.

After three years of siege, the Dutch finally managed to sack Bonjol on 16 August 1837. Through a negotiation ruse, the Dutch again captured Syarif and exiled him, first to Cianjur in West Java, then to Ambon, and later to Manado in Sulawesi. He died on 6 November 1864, at the age of 92 and is buried in Sulawesi. The site of his grave is marked by a Minangkabau (West Sumatran) house.

Controversy over National Hero Title 
Imam Bonjol and the Padri Movement have been accused of Wahhabism and of conducting crime against Batak people according to some Batak historians, specifically Mangaradja Onggang Parlindungan and international sources. Some Batak historians argued that Imam Bonjol does not deserve the National Hero title because of his past actions and his ideological motives. Reports from Dutch colonial and Batak lore about the notoriety of Imam Bonjol’s movement have been the source for almost a century of discussion among experts on the role of Imam Bonjol in the past.

See also
 History of Indonesia
 Padri War

References

External links

  Bio Imam Bonjol at Ensiklopedi Tokoh Indonesia
https://web.archive.org/web/20021204081533/http://www.minahasa.net/en/history-imambonjol.html

1772 births
1864 deaths
Minangkabau people
National Heroes of Indonesia
Indonesian Sunni Muslims
Indonesian Muslims
Indonesian exiles
Indonesian imams
Padris